To Be Continued... is a four-disc box set detailing English musician Elton John's music from his days with Bluesology to the then-present day. It was compiled by Bernie Taupin and John and was completed in 1990. 

Aside from hit singles, this box set features deep cuts, unreleased music, fan favorites and live performances in John's career. Four new songs ("Made for Me", "You Gotta Love Someone", "I Swear I Heard the Night Talkin'" and "Easier to Walk Away") were recorded for the box set.

Release
Newly sober John was unhappy with the US cover art (it reminded him of his old excesses), so the 1991 UK release was issued with new cover art and also replaced "You Gotta Love Someone" (which had already been released on The Very Best of Elton John the previous year) and "I Swear I Heard the Night Talkin'" with then-unreleased "Suit of Wolves" and "Understanding Women", the former a B-side to "The One" and the latter later included as a track on the 1992 album The One. 

MCA's rights to John's music lapsed in the 1990s, and the Elton John back catalogue was reverted to Polydor Records, which put it back out in upgraded editions on the Island Records label. This set was deleted by 1994, and was soon selling for serious amounts of money as a collector's item. However in 1999, MCA's parent company, Universal Music, bought Polydor, and suddenly this box set reappeared.

In the US, it was certified gold in June 1992 and platinum in November 2006. In April 2016, it was certified 2 x platinum by the RIAA.

Track listing
All songs written by Elton John and Bernie Taupin, except where noted.

Certifications

References

1990 compilation albums
Elton John compilation albums
Albums produced by Chris Thomas (record producer)
Albums produced by Gus Dudgeon
Albums produced by Don Was
Albums recorded at Trident Studios
MCA Records compilation albums
The Rocket Record Company compilation albums